Galatasaray SK Wheelchair Basketball 2008–2009 season is the 2008–2009 basketball season for Turkish professional basketball club Galatasaray SK.

The club competes in:
IWBF Champions Cup : Winner
Kitakyushu Champions Cup : Winner
Turkish Wheelchair Basketball Super League : Winner

2008–09 roster

Squad changes for the 2008–2009 season

In:

Out:

Results, schedules and standings

Preseason games

Turkish Wheelchair Basketball Super League 2008–09

Regular season
First Half

Second Half

IWBF Champions Cup

Semi Final

FINAL

Kitakyushu Champions Cup 2009

FINAL

References

Galatasaray S.K. (wheelchair basketball) seasons
2008–09 in Turkish basketball by club
2009 in wheelchair basketball
2008 in wheelchair basketball
Galatasaray Sports Club 2008–09 season